Zlatozar Atanasov (Bulgarian: Златозар Атанасов; born 12 December 1989) is a Bulgarian athlete specialising in the triple jump. He represented his country at the 2013 World Championships without qualifying for the final. In addition, he finished eleventh at the 2012 European Championships and seventh at the 2013 European Indoor Championships.
 
His personal bests in the event are 17.09 metres outdoors (+1.3 m/s, Burgas 2013) and 16.70 metres indoors (Dobrich 2013).

Competition record

References

1989 births
Living people
Bulgarian male triple jumpers